Cria Cuervo is the third successful album made by Toque Profundo, released independently like their previous two albums.

Track listing
  Levántate
  Fantasma Azul
  Libérame
  Cría Cuervos
  Noche Sin Luna
  Infidelidad Triangular
  Tu Sombra
  Botas Negras
  Mujer Perdida
  Espero Que Ardas
  XXX ft. Mariano Lantigua
  Dando Aco
  Viajero (Acústico)

See also
Toque Profundo
Sueños Y Pesadillas Del 3er Mundo
Moneda

References 

1999 albums
Toque Profundo albums